Levente Csillag (born 22 March 1973) is a retired Hungarian hurdler who specialized in the 110 metres hurdles.
He was born in Veszprém.

Career
He competed at the 1994 European Championships, the 1995 World Championships, the 1996 Olympic Games, the 1997 World Championships,
 the 1998 European Indoor Championships, the 2000 European Indoor Championships, the 2000 Olympic Games, the 2002 European Championships and the 2004 Olympic Games without reaching the final.

He became Hungarian national champion in 1993, 1994, 1995, 1996, 1997, 1999, 2000, 2001, 2002 and 2004. His dominance over Hungarian hurdling was precedented by György Bakos, who won twelve times in a row between 1980 and 1991. He became Hungarian indoor champion only once, in 1998.

His personal best time is 13.44 seconds, achieved in August 1997 in Leverkusen. This was the Hungarian record for some years, but he has since been surpassed by Dániel Kiss.

References

1973 births
Living people
Hungarian male hurdlers
Athletes (track and field) at the 1996 Summer Olympics
Athletes (track and field) at the 2000 Summer Olympics
Athletes (track and field) at the 2004 Summer Olympics
Olympic athletes of Hungary
People from Veszprém
Sportspeople from Veszprém County